George Lawson (October 12, 1827 – November 10, 1895) was a Scottish-Canadian botanist who is considered the "father of Canadian botany".

Born in Scotland, in 1858, he was appointed the Professor of Chemistry and Natural History at Queen's University. He helped to create one of Canada's first botanical gardens.

In 1868, he became Professor of Chemistry and Mineralogy at Dalhousie University.

He was a charter member of the Royal Society of Canada and from 1887 to 1888 was its president.

References

External links 
 

19th-century Canadian botanists
Scottish botanists
Scottish curators
Scottish librarians
1827 births
1895 deaths
Botanists active in North America
Academics of the University of Edinburgh
Alumni of the University of Edinburgh
Academic staff of the Dalhousie University
Academic staff of the Queen's University at Kingston
Scottish emigrants to pre-Confederation Ontario
Pre-Confederation Ontario people
People from Dundee
People from Fife
Scottish scholars and academics
19th-century Scottish scientists
19th-century British botanists